The 2020 Russian Figure Skating Championships were held from 24 to 29 December 2019 in Krasnoyarsk. Medals were awarded in the disciplines of men's singles, ladies' singles, pair skating, and ice dancing. The results were among the criteria used to select the Russian teams for the 2020 European Championships and 2020 World Championships.

Competitions
In the 2019–20 season, Russian skaters competed in domestic qualifying events and national championships for various age levels. The Russian Cup series led to three events – the Russian Championships, the Russian Junior Championships, and the Russian Cup Final.

Medalists of most important competitions

Senior Championships
The 2020 Russian Championships was held in Krasnoyarsk, Krasnoyarsk Krai from 24 to 29 December 2019. Competitors qualified through international success or by competing in the Russian Cup series' senior-level events.

There are three separate basis for qualification.
1. Qualification based on receiving 2019–20 Grand Prix assignment.
2. Qualification based on qualifying for the 2019–20 Junior Grand Prix Final. However, skaters must have been born in 2005 or earlier to be qualified for the Russian senior championships. In addition, junior ice dance teams do not compete at senior national championships due to different program requirements between the junior and senior levels. Consequently, ice dance teams cannot use their junior level programs for senior competition.
3. Qualification based on Russian Cup series' results.

Schedule
Listed in local time (UTC +7).

Preliminary entries

Changes to preliminary entries

Results

Men

Ladies

Pairs

Ice dance

Junior Championships
The 2020 Russian Junior Championships was held in Saransk, Mordovia on 4–8 February 2020. Competitors qualified through international success or by competing in the Russian Cup series' junior-level events. The results of the Junior Championships were part of the selection criteria for the 2020 World Junior Championships.

There are two separate basis for qualification.
1. Qualification based on competing at the 2019–20 Junior Grand Prix series.
2. Qualification based on Russian Cup series' junior-level results.

Preliminary entries

Changes to preliminary entries

Results

Men

Ladies

Pairs

Ice dance

International team selections

Winter Youth Olympics
The list with preliminary entries of the Russia's team to the 2020 Winter Youth Olympics was published on 16 December 2019. The final list was approved on 24 December 2019.

European Championships
Russia's team to the 2020 European Championships was published on 29 December 2019.

World Championships
Russia's team to the 2020 World Championships was published on 31 January 2020.

World Junior Championships
Russia's team to the 2020 World Junior Championships was published on 10 February 2020.

References

Russian Figure Skating Championships
Russian Championships
Russian Championships
Figure Skating Championships
Figure Skating Championships
December 2019 sports events in Russia